Khari River is a river in Western India in Gujarat whose origin is Near Matana Madh village. Its basin has a maximum length of 50 km.

References

Rivers of Gujarat
Rivers of India